The 2010 Finnish Figure Skating Championships took place between December 18 and 20, 2009 at the Synergia-arena in Jyväskylä. Skaters competed in the disciplines of men's singles, ladies' singles, and ice dancing on the senior and junior levels. The results were one of the criteria used to choose the Finnish teams to the 2010 World Championships, the 2010 European Championships, and the 2010 World Junior Championships.

Senior results

Men

Ladies

Ice dancing

Junior results

Men

Ladies

Ice dancing

External links
 2010 Finnish Championships results
 Official site  

Finnish Figure Skating Championships
Finnish Figure Skating Championships, 2010
2009 in figure skating
Sport in Jyväskylä
2009 in Finnish sport